Break in the Sun is a British television serial made by the BBC in 1981.

The series, written by Bernard Ashley, was considerably more gritty and controversial than standard BBC children's serial fare up until that time, dealing with a young girl, Patsy (Nicola Cowper) running away from her violent stepfather (Brian Hall) and trying to return to her mother's old home in Margate.

The theme tune, "Reflections", was written by John Renbourn.

External links
 

1981 British television series debuts
1981 British television series endings
1980s British children's television series
BBC children's television shows
English-language television shows